Leo Patrick Monaghan (22 August 1916 – 23 March 1996) was an Australian rules footballer who played with South Melbourne and Fitzroy in the Victorian Football League (VFL).

Notes

External links 

1916 births
1996 deaths
Australian rules footballers from New South Wales
Sydney Swans players
Fitzroy Football Club players